Refilwe Maria Tsipane (born 3 September 1973), known as Refilwe Mtsweni-Tsipane (alternatively spelt Mtshweni), is a South African politician and a party member of the African National Congress (ANC), who has been serving as the 5th Premier of Mpumalanga since 20 March 2018. She succeeded former Premier David Mabuza after he was appointed Deputy President of South Africa. Mtsweni-Tsipane is also a Member of the Mpumalanga Provincial Legislature and previously served as the MEC for Co-operative Governance and Traditional Affairs.

Family and personal life
Mtsweni-Tsipane is married to Lawrence Tsipane and has two children. She spent most of her childhood in Lynnville, Emalahleni, where she went to primary school. She completed her secondary education in Atteridgeville in Pretoria. She obtained a Human Resources Diploma from the Tshwane University of Technology and a Certificate of Leadership and Governance from the University of the Witwatersrand.

In late-September 2020, Mtsweni-Tsipane announced that she had tested positive for COVID-19.

Political career
Mtsweni-Tsipane was elected to the Mpumalanga Provincial Legislature in 2014 and was sworn in as a Member on 21 May 2014. Premier David Mabuza announced his new Executive Council in late-May and Mtsweni-Tsipane was selected to be the MEC for Co-operative Governance and Traditional Affairs. The Democratic Alliance Provincial Leader, Anthony Benadie, said in a statement that Mtsweni-Tsipane "lacks the skill or strength of character to manage a complex portfolio".

In July 2017, when Mtsweni-Tsipane served as acting premier, she declared a special provincial funeral for Ray Phiri.

On 27 February 2018, she was sworn in as acting premier by Judge President Malesela Legodi, replacing Mabuza, who was appointed Deputy President of South Africa. The Provincial Democratic Alliance Leader Jane Sithole said that the swearing-in of Mtsweni-Tsipane was "unconstitutional" because former Mabuza was not in the position to appoint an acting premier to a position that he no longer holds.

She was sworn in for a second time as acting premier on 1 March 2018 in Pretoria. On 14 March 2018, the ANC NEC officially nominated Mtsweni-Tsipane to become the Premier of Mpumalanga. She served as Premier-elect until the legislature confirmed her to the position on 20 March.  She was formally inaugurated on that same day by Legodi. She is the first woman to hold the role.

Following the May 2019 elections, the African National Congress announced that it had retained Mtsweni-Tsipane as Premier of Mpumalanga. She took office for her first full term on 27 May 2019.

In January 2021, Mtsweni-Tsipane attracted criticism after she arrived at Jackson Mthembu's funeral without wearing a mask, despite COVID-19 regulations stipulating that a mask must be worn in public. The premier's office stated that her mask was broken and that she was oblivious that it had fallen off. Mtsweni-Tsipane also apologised for the incident, however, the national minister of police, Bheki Cele, called for an investigation into her actions. She later signed admission of guilt and apologised for not wearing a mask. The incident also resulted in a R1,500 fine for Mtsweni-Tsipane, and Cele confirmed that she now has a criminal record.

On 16 February 2021, she withdrew her candidacy for ANC provincial chairperson.

Notes

References

External links
People's Assembly profile

Premiers of Mpumalanga
Living people
Tshwane University of Technology alumni
University of the Witwatersrand alumni
African National Congress politicians
21st-century South African politicians
21st-century South African women politicians
1973 births
Members of the Mpumalanga Provincial Legislature